The Yale Symphony Orchestra is a symphony orchestra at Yale University which performs in Yale's Woolsey Hall and tours internationally and domestically. The present Music Director is William Boughton.

History
The Yale Symphony Orchestra was founded in 1965 by a small group of Yale students who sensed the need for an ensemble devoted to the performance of orchestral repertoire.  It developed from Yale's Calhoun College Chamber Music Orchestra when three of its members sought to expand the orchestra to provide an opportunity for larger-scale orchestral performances.

In its first campus-wide incarnation, the Yale Symphony Orchestra was known as the Yale Symphonic Society. It was originally composed of both undergraduates and graduate students from the Yale School of Music, in contrast to its primarily undergraduate population today.  By 1967, the campus had begun to refer to the Yale Symphonic Society as the Yale Symphony Orchestra instead, and the orchestra had instated Richmond Browne as its first permanent conductor.

The following years saw growth for the orchestra as former undergraduate and then-graduate student John Mauceri '67 replaced Browne as conductor in the fall of 1968.  Mauceri's adventurous programming helped the orchestra expand its membership and its popularity on campus.  In 1971, the orchestra traveled to France for its first international tour; domestic and international tours have continued to the present day.

The Yale Symphony Orchestra today
The membership of today's Yale Symphony Orchestra is composed primarily of undergraduates, who audition in early September and are "tapped," a scaled-down version of the selection of a cappella groups, shortly thereafter.  Yale Symphony Orchestra rehearsals take place twice a week for two and a half hours in Woolsey Hall.  The orchestra performs five regular concerts per season, with programming varying from the traditional (Beethoven's Symphony no. 6) to the adventurous (Ligeti's Apparitions).

The Halloween Show has become a campus-wide tradition.  The orchestra spends the months before Halloween shooting and editing a silent film, which they screen at 11:59 p.m. on October 31 in Woolsey Hall.  The orchestra plays a soundtrack with selections ranging from repertoire staples to arrangements of pop songs.  Cameo appearances in the films have included actors Sarah Jessica Parker and James Franco, singer-songwriter Alanis Morissette, and politicians John Kerry, Hillary Clinton, and John McCain.

On March 31, 2007, the Yale Symphony Orchestra became the first undergraduate orchestra to perform as the featured orchestra in Video Games Live.

Conductors
The following conductors have served as Music Directors of the Yale Symphony Orchestra:

Richmond Browne, 1967–1968
John Mauceri '67, 1968–1974
C. William Harwood, 1974–1977
Robert Kapilow '75, 1977–1983
Leif Bjaland, 1983–1986
Alasdair Neale, 1986–1989
David Stern, 1989–1990
James Ross, 1990–1994
James Sinclair, 1994–1995
Shinik Hahm, 1995–2004
George Rothman, 2004–2005
Toshiyuki Shimada, 2005–2019
William Boughton, 2019–present

Notable Premieres
Throughout its history, the Yale Symphony Orchestra has performed new music as well as staples of orchestral repertoire. Examples of some notable world and regional premieres are:

Leonard Bernstein's Mass, 1973, European premiere
Charles Ives' Three Places in New England, definitive restoration
Claude Debussy's Khamma, United States premiere
Benjamin Britten's The Building of the House, East Coast premiere
Anthony Heinrich's The Columbiad, or Migration of American Wild Passenger Pigeons, North American premiere

Alumni and Soloists

Marin Alsop, conductor; Music Director of the Baltimore Symphony Orchestra
Leopold Stokowski, conductor
Gilbert Levine, conductor
Luciano Berio, composer
Yo-Yo Ma, cellist
Ralph Kirshbaum, cellist
Sophie Shao, cellist
Frederica von Stade, mezzo-soprano
Susan Davenny-Wyner, soprano
Emanuel Ax, pianist
Peter Frankl, pianist
İdil Biret, pianist
Boris Berman, pianist
John Kirkpatrick, pianist
Melvin Chen, pianist
Syoko Aki, violinist
Sharon Yamada, violinist
Tokyo String Quartet, string quartet
David Shifrin, clarinetist
Dawn Upshaw, soprano

Sources

External links
YSO's Website

Yale University musical groups
Musical groups established in 1965
Wikipedia requested audio of orchestras